The selection of the Democratic Party's vice presidential candidate for the 1980 United States presidential election occurred at the party's national convention on August 11, 1980. Although incumbent Presidents and Vice Presidents are usually renominated with acclamation, during the Democratic primaries, Senator Ted Kennedy mounted a primary challenge to President Jimmy Carter that lasted until the presidential ballot at the national convention. The Carter–Mondale ticket ultimately lost to the Reagan–Bush ticket.

Finalists

Shortly before the convention convened Kennedy spent the remaining days campaigning in New York City and released a list of seven possible vice presidential running mates that consisted of Senator Henry M. Jackson, Former Governor Reubin Askew, Mayor Tom Bradley, Representative Lindy Boggs, Secretary of Education Shirley Hufstedler, Representative L. Richardson Preyer, and Senator Adlai Stevenson III.

Convention

Kennedy refused to drop out of the presidential election as he was attempting to have the rule bounding all delegates on the first ballot. Following the failure to overturn the rule on August 11, Kennedy ended his presidential campaign. The delegates bound to Kennedy either voted for Kennedy, another candidate, or abstain in both the presidential and vice presidential ballots in protest.

During the vice presidential nomination roll call vote over twenty percent of the delegates abstained from the vote and the remaining Kennedy delegates voted for a variety of candidates with socialist Mel Boozer being the most successful with over one percent.

References

Vice presidency of the United States
1980 United States presidential election